The Tissington Trail is a bridleway, footpath and cycleway in Derbyshire, England, along part of the trackbed of the former railway line connecting Ashbourne to Buxton. It takes its name from the village of Tissington, which it skirts.

Route details

The trail has a firm crushed-limestone surface, which is suitable for cyclists, walkers and wheelchair users. It has easy level access at many points along its route.

Hartington signal box, beside the trail although some distance from the village, has been converted to an information centre, which is open in summer on Saturdays, Sundays and Bank Holidays. The National Park Authority operates cycle hire at both ends of the trail.

From Hartington station northwards, the route is part of the Pennine Bridleway, a  leisure route which includes  through Derbyshire to the South Pennines.  The bridleway has two southern starting points, with another at Middleton Top, near Cromford, on the High Peak Trail.

Facilities
 At Parsley Hay, there is a car park, toilets, picnic site, visitor information, cafe and cycle hire. There is direct level access to the trail.
 At Hartington station, there is a car park with toilets and picnic site. There is level access onto the trail.
 At Ruby Wood, there is a car park and a picnic site.
 At Alsop-en-le-Dale station, there is a car park with picnic site. There is level access onto the trail.
 At Tissington station, there is a car park, cafe, toilets and picnic site, with a tea room in the village itself.
 At Thorpe station, there is a small car park and picnic site, with level access onto the trail.
 At Narlows Lane, near Thorpe,, there is a car park.
 At Mapleton Lane, near Ashbourne, there is a car park, cafe, toilets and cycle hire.

History of the route

Built by the LNWR, the line opened in 1899, and linked with the Cromford and High Peak Railway at Parsley Hay, a line completed nearly 70 years earlier to link the Cromford Canal wharf at High Peak Junction with the Peak Forest Canal at Whaley Bridge.  It was the last of the railways to be built in the Peak District. Whilst the section from Parsley Hay to Ashbourne was single track (from Parsley Hay north to Buxton it was double) the formation was constructed to allow for doubling if necessary, but this never happened. There were passing loops at Hartington, Alsop-en-le-Dale, Tissington and Thorpe Cloud.

Despite the relatively short length of this branch line, it was deservedly popular with walkers and ramblers, enjoying its heyday in the 1930s.  Apart from the elevated views over the Peak itself, a large attraction was that this line passed close to Dovedale. The line for a time also carried a through-service (i.e. without changing carriages) for passengers from London Euston (via Nuneaton, Uttoxeter and Ashbourne) to Buxton and Manchester.  A daily train also transported local milk to London.  However, the line suffered from passing through a sparsely populated area, and it was closed to regular passenger traffic in 1954, and all services between Ashbourne and Hartington, including excursion traffic and specials (such as run during bad weather, or well dressing specials), ceased in October 1963. The route between Hartington and Parsley Hay survived until October 1967.

See also
Monsal Trail
Cycleways in England

References

External links

Tissington Trail – access and facilities
The Tissington Trail Sustrans cycle route

Peak District
Footpaths in Derbyshire
Rail trails in England
Tourist attractions of the Peak District